Kubadin Point (‘Nos Kubadin’ \'nos ku-ba-'din\) is the ice-covered point on the southwest side of the entrance to Linevo Cove on the southeast coast of Smith Island in the South Shetland Islands, Antarctica.  The point is named after the settlement of Kubadin in Southeastern Bulgaria.

Location
Bulgarian mapping in 2009 and 2010.

Maps
Chart of South Shetland including Coronation Island, &c. from the exploration of the sloop Dove in the years 1821 and 1822 by George Powell Commander of the same. Scale ca. 1:200000. London: Laurie, 1822.
  L.L. Ivanov. Antarctica: Livingston Island and Greenwich, Robert, Snow and Smith Islands. Scale 1:120000 topographic map. Troyan: Manfred Wörner Foundation, 2010.  (First edition 2009. )
 South Shetland Islands: Smith and Low Islands. Scale 1:150000 topographic map No. 13677. British Antarctic Survey, 2009.
 Antarctic Digital Database (ADD). Scale 1:250000 topographic map of Antarctica. Scientific Committee on Antarctic Research (SCAR). Since 1993, regularly upgraded and updated.
 L.L. Ivanov. Antarctica: Livingston Island and Smith Island. Scale 1:100000 topographic map. Manfred Wörner Foundation, 2017.

References
 Bulgarian Antarctic Gazetteer. Antarctic Place-names Commission. (details in Bulgarian, basic data in English)
 Kubadin Point. SCAR Composite Antarctic Gazetteer

External links
 Kubadin Point. Copernix satellite image

Bulgaria and the Antarctic
Headlands of Smith Island (South Shetland Islands)